Ronald J. Williams is professor of computer science at Northeastern University, and one of the pioneers of neural networks. He co-authored a paper on the backpropagation algorithm which triggered a boom in neural network research. He also made fundamental contributions to the fields of recurrent neural networks and reinforcement learning. 
Together with Wenxu Tong and Mary Jo Ondrechen he developed Partial Order Optimum Likelihood (POOL), a machine learning method used in the prediction of active amino acids in protein structures. POOL is a maximum likelihood method with a monotonicity constraint and is a general predictor of properties that depend monotonically on the input features.

References

External links
Home page of Ronald J. Williams

American computer scientists
Northeastern University faculty
People from Boston
Living people
Year of birth missing (living people)